"Traîtres" is a song by Lacrim released in 2017. The song peaked at number two on the French Singles Chart.

Charts

References

2017 singles
2017 songs
French-language songs